| tries = {{#expr:
  7 +  1 +
  1 + 11 +
  2 +  2 +
  5 +  3 +
  7 +  0 +
  8 +  0 +
  2 +  2 +
  0 +  0

}}
| top scorer =
| most tries =
| website    = Rugby Europe
| preceded by = 2021–22
| succeeded by =2023–24
}}

The 2022–23 Rugby Europe Women's Trophy is the 22st edition of Rugby Europe's second division competition for women's national rugby union teams. The winner of the tournament will be promoted to the 2024 Championship

Standings

Results

Leading scorers

Most points

Most tries

References

2022
Rugby Europe Women's Trophy
Rugby Europe Women's Trophy
Rugby union in Belgium
Rugby union in the Czech Republic
Rugby union in Finland
Rugby union in Germany
Rugby union in Portugal
2022 in women's rugby union
2023 in women's rugby union